Clifton is a given name. Notable people with the name include:

Clifton R. Breckinridge (1846-1932), American politician
Clifton Chenier (1925–1987), American zydeco musician
Clifton Collins Jr. (born 1970), American actor
Clifton Davis (born 1945), American actor
Clifton Fadiman (1904-1999), American radio and television personality
Clifton Grima, Maltese politician
Clifton A. Hall (1826-1913), a Rhode Island architect
Clifton James (1921–2017), American actor
Clifton Jones (born 1937), Jamaican actor
Clifton Leaf, American journalist, editor of Fortune magazine
Clifton Maloney (1937-2009), American businessman
Clifton Parker (1905–1989), English composer
Clifton Sandvliet (born 1977), Surinamese retired footballer
Clifton Sprague (1896–1955), World War II–era officer in the U.S. Navy
Clifton Sunada (born 1971), American judoka
Clifton Webb (1889–1966), American actor
Clifton Williams (1932–1967), NASA astronaut and USMC Major

English masculine given names